Gamma I or Gamma 1 is a commercial-cum residential locality in western Greater Noida, Uttar Pradesh, India. Bordered by Gamma II to the east, Beta I to the south and Knowledge Park III and Knowledge Park I to the west, it is considered one of the affluent neighborhoods in the city and is also known for serving the Jagat Farm market and Kadamba Shopping Complex.

Landmarks 

 Jagat Farm market
 Kadamba Shopping Complex
 Shram Vihar Park

References 

Gautam Buddh Nagar district